Paramount Comedy may refer to:

Comedy Central (British TV channel), formerly known as Paramount Comedy
Comedy Central (Spanish TV channel), formerly known as Paramount Comedy
Comedy Central (Italian TV channel), formerly known as Paramount Comedy
Comedy Central (Russian TV channel), formerly known as Paramount Comedy